Orjand Beqiri (born 21 February 1985) is an Albanian football player who plays for KS Besa Kavajë in the Albanian First Division as a centre back.

Club career

Luftëtari Gjirokastër
In July 2015, Beqiri completed a transfer to Luftëtari Gjirokastër, returning for the first time in two years.

In the 2017–18 season, he played 32 league matches as the team finished third, meaning that Luftëtari have gained the right to play in European competitions for the first time in history.

On 4 June 2018, he confirmed his departure from the club after three seasons, stating: My adventure at Gjirokastër came to an end."

Kamza
On 9 July 2018, Beqiri begun training with fellow top flight side Kamza. He got his exit permit from Luftëtari only on 14 August as his transfer to Kamza become official. Beqiri was allocated squad number 20 and made his debut by playing full-90 minutes in Kamza's opening league match, a 1–0 surprise win over Tirana.

Honours
Flamurtari Vlorë
Albanian First Division: 2008–09, 2013–14

Luftëtari Gjirokastër
Albanian First Division: 2015–16

References

External links
FSHF profile

1985 births
Living people
Footballers from Vlorë
Albanian footballers
Association football defenders
Kategoria e Parë players
Kategoria Superiore players
Flamurtari Vlorë players
Luftëtari Gjirokastër players
KF Adriatiku Mamurrasi players
FC Kamza players